The Judo at the 2011 European Youth Summer Olympic Festival contests were held from 26 to 29 July 2011. The competitions took place at the Of Arena in Trabzon, Turkey. Boys and girls born 1995/1996 or later participated at following 8 disciplines for boys and 7 for girls.

Results

Boys

Girls

References

External links
 

2011 European Youth Summer Olympic Festival
2011 European Youth Olympics
European Youth Summer Olympic Festival
European